The 1998 Toray Pan Pacific Open was a women's tennis tournament played onindoor carpet courts at the Tokyo Metropolitan Gymnasium in Tokyo, Japan that was part of Tier I of the 1998 WTA Tour. It was the 23rd edition of the tournament and was held from 3 February 3 through 8 February 1998. Second-seeded Lindsay Davenport won the singles title and earned $150,000 first-prize money.

Header

Singles

 Lindsay Davenport defeated  Martina Hingis 6–3, 6–3
 It was Davenport's 1st title of the year and the 32nd of her career.

Doubles

 Martina Hingis /  Mirjana Lučić defeated  Lindsay Davenport /  Natasha Zvereva 7–5, 6–4
 It was Hingis' 4th title of the year and the 30th of her career. It was Lučić's 2nd title of the year and the 3rd of her career.

External links
 ITF tournament edition details
 Tournament draws

Toray Pan Pacific Open
Pan Pacific Open
Toray Pan Pacific Open
Toray Pan Pacific Open
 
Toray Pan Pacific Open